Sten Lindgren (22 June 1903 – 13 May 1959) was a Swedish film actor. He made his debut in the 1925 silent historical film Charles XII.

Selected filmography
 Charles XII (1925)
 Ingmar's Inheritance (1925)
 People of Hälsingland (1933)
 Ocean Breakers (1935)
 The Boys of Number Fifty Seven (1935)
 The Lady Becomes a Maid (1936)
 The People of Bergslagen (1937)
 Storm Over the Skerries (1938)
 For Better, for Worse (1938)
 Life Goes On (1941)
 The Train Leaves at Nine (1941)
 The Yellow Clinic (1942)
 Captured by a Voice (1943)
 Young Blood (1943)
 The Old Clock at Ronneberga (1944)
 Eaglets (1944)
 The Forest Is Our Heritage (1944)
 The Emperor of Portugallia (1944)
 Motherhood (1945)
 Sunshine Follows Rain (1946)
 The Wedding on Solö (1946)
 Dynamite (1947)
 The Poetry of Ådalen (1947)
 The Girl from the Marsh Croft (1947)
 Lars Hård (1948)
 The Devil and the Smalander (1949)
 Bohus Battalion (1949)
 Big Lasse of Delsbo (1949)
 The Realm of the Rye (1950)
 Valley of Eagles (1951)
 Stronger Than the Law (1951)
 In Lilac Time (1952)
 Ursula, the Girl from the Finnish Forests (1953)
 A Goat in the Garden (1958)
 Fridolf Stands Up! (1958)

References

Bibliography
 Chandler, Charlotte. Ingrid: Ingrid Bergman, A Personal Biography. Simon and Schuster, 2007.

External links

1903 births
1959 deaths
Swedish male stage actors
Swedish male film actors
Swedish male silent film actors
People from Munkfors Municipality
20th-century Swedish male actors